Statistics of Portuguese Liga in the 1969/1970 season.

Overview
It was contested by 14 teams, and Sporting Clube de Portugal won the championship.

League standings

Results

Footnotes

External links
 Portugal 1969-70 - RSSSF (Jorge Miguel Teixeira)
 Portuguese League 1969/70 - footballzz.co.uk
 Portugal - Table of Honor - Soccer Library

Primeira Liga seasons
1969–70 in Portuguese football
Portugal